was a professional wrestling event promoted by World Wonder Ring Stardom. The event took place on January 20, 2023, in Tokyo, Japan at the  Belle Salle Takadanoba, with limited attendance due in part to the ongoing COVID-19 pandemic at the time. The event saw first round matches in a tournament to crown the inaugural New Blood Tag Team Champions

Background
The "New Blood" is a series of events that mainly focus on matches where rookie wrestlers, usually with three or fewer years of in-ring experience, evolve. Besides wrestlers from Stardom, various superstars from multiple promotions of the Japanese independent scene are invited to compete in bouts that are usually going under the stipulation of singles or tag team matches.

The show featured seven professional wrestling matches that resulted from scripted storylines, where wrestlers portrayed villains, heroes, or less distinguishable characters in the scripted events that built tension and culminated in a wrestling match or series of matches. 
During the Stardom New Blood 6 event, it was announced that New Blood Tag Team Championship would be introduced, with a tournament to crown the inaugural champions beginning at New Blood 7 on January 20, and concluding at New Blood Premium in Yokohama Budokan on March 25. The event's official press conference was broadcast on Stardom's YouTube channel on January 5, 2023.

New Blood Tag Team Championship Inaugural tournament

Event
The entire event was broadcast live on Stardom's YouTube channel. In the first match, Rina picked up a victory over rookie Miran. Next, Ruaka defeated Marika Kobashi. The third bout saw Nanae Takahashi defeating Waka Tsukiyama in a passion-injection match. The next four matches portraited the quarterfinals of the New Blood Tag Team Championship inaugural tournament. First, Ami Sourei and Nanami getting a victory over Momo Kohgo of Stars and freelancer Momoka Hanazono. Next, Donna Del Mondo's Mai Sakurai and Chanyota of P.P.P. Tokyo picked up a victory over Hina and Lady C. Next, Starlight Kid and Ruaka surpassed the team of Xia Brookside and Mariah May. The main event saw Mirai and Tomoka Inaba defeating Saya Iida and Hanan, wrapping up the event and establishing the semifinals of the new championships tournament.

Results

Notes

References

External links
Stardom website
Stardom World website (VOD service)

2023 in professional wrestling
2023 in Tokyo
World Wonder Ring Stardom shows
Professional wrestling in Tokyo
Women's professional wrestling shows
World Wonder Ring Stardom